A Youth Advisory Council is a body of young people appointed by one or more governmental officials, institutions, or organizations to advise on issues of public policy or administrative actions which are felt to directly affect young people.

Youth Advisory Councils were widely appointed in the era of youth unrest in the late 1960s and early 1970s, but have since often been phased out.

The end of the War in Vietnam, the abolition of the military draft, the reduction of the voting age to 18, the creating of more high school and college courses relevant to the interests of young people, the relaxation of controls on sexual activity, the inclusion of students on university boards, a greater increase of demands on the time of young people, and a generally increased responsiveness by authorities to the concerns of young people, all worked to lessen youth alienation and reduce the perceived need for Youth Advisory Councils in the United States. Similar changes in other countries reduced the need for Youth Advisory Councils there.

Although Youth Advisory Councils are no longer nearly universal, they still are found across the country and across the world and involve many youth in their deliberations.

Books dealing with Youth Advisory Councils

Cassandra Mack and Kaydia Ramsey, SMART MOVES THAT SUCCESSFUL YOUTH WORKERS MAKE (2005)
Josephine A. Van Linden and Carl I. Fertman, YOUTH LEADERSHIP: A GUIDE TO UNDERSTANDING LEADERSHIP DEVELOPMENT IN ADOLESCENTS (1998)
Francisco A. Villarruel, Daniel Francis Perkins, Lynne M. Borden, and Joane G. Kech, COMMUNITY YOUTH DEVELOPMENT: PRAYERS, POLICIES, AND PRACTICES (2003)

External links
http://www.unepapac.org/
http://www.tnfosteryouth.org/
https://web.archive.org/web/20071002131647/http://ltgov.wa.gov:80/YouthandCommunities/LYAC/default.html
https://web.archive.org/web/20071013122431/http://nylc.org:80/about_youthadvisory.cfm
http://www.kychildnow.org/involvement/council.html
http://www.nfyac.org/
http://www.brcofoundation.org/yac/index.html

Youth organizations